Psalm 71 is the 71st psalm of the Book of Psalms, beginning in English in the King James Version: "In thee, O LORD, do I put my trust: let me never be put to confusion". It has no title in the Hebrew version. In the slightly different numbering system used in the Greek Septuagint and Latin Vulgate translations of the Bible, this psalm is Psalm 70. In Latin, it is known as "In te Domine speravi".

The psalm has 24 verses in both English and Hebrew verse numbering. It forms a regular part of Jewish, Catholic, Lutheran, Anglican and other Protestant liturgies. It has been paraphrased in hymns and set to music.

Text

Hebrew Bible version 
Following is the Hebrew text of Psalm 71:

King James Version 
The following is the full English text of the Psalm from the King James Bible.
 In thee, O LORD, do I put my trust: let me never be put to confusion.
 Deliver me in thy righteousness, and cause me to escape: incline thine ear unto me, and save me.
 Be thou my strong habitation, whereunto I may continually resort: thou hast given commandment to save me; for thou art my rock and my fortress.
 Deliver me, O my God, out of the hand of the wicked, out of the hand of the unrighteous and cruel man.
 For thou art my hope, O Lord GOD: thou art my trust from my youth.
 By thee have I been holden up from the womb: thou art he that took me out of my mother's bowels: my praise shall be continually of thee.
 I am as a wonder unto many; but thou art my strong refuge.
 Let my mouth be filled with thy praise and with thy honour all the day.
 Cast me not off in the time of old age; forsake me not when my strength faileth.
 For mine enemies speak against me; and they that lay wait for my soul take counsel together,
 Saying, God hath forsaken him: persecute and take him; for there is none to deliver him.
 O God, be not far from me: O my God, make haste for my help.
 Let them be confounded and consumed that are adversaries to my soul; let them be covered with reproach and dishonour that seek my hurt.
 But I will hope continually, and will yet praise thee more and more.
 My mouth shall shew forth thy righteousness and thy salvation all the day; for I know not the numbers thereof.
 I will go in the strength of the Lord GOD: I will make mention of thy righteousness, even of thine only.
 O God, thou hast taught me from my youth: and hitherto have I declared thy wondrous works.
 Now also when I am old and grayheaded, O God, forsake me not; until I have shewed thy strength unto this generation, and thy power to every one that is to come.
 Thy righteousness also, O God, is very high, who hast done great things: O God, who is like unto thee!
 Thou, which hast shewed me great and sore troubles, shalt quicken me again, and shalt bring me up again from the depths of the earth.
 Thou shalt increase my greatness, and comfort me on every side.
 I will also praise thee with the psaltery, even thy truth, O my God: unto thee will I sing with the harp, O thou Holy One of Israel.
 My lips shall greatly rejoice when I sing unto thee; and my soul, which thou hast redeemed.
 My tongue also shall talk of thy righteousness all the day long: for they are confounded, for they are brought unto shame, that seek my hurt.

Commentary 
Psalm 71 in the Hebrew text does not have a title, one of four such psalms in the first two books of the Psalter. However, the Greek Septuagint text bears the title: "By David, of the sons of Jonadab and the first ones taken captive".

Theologian Albert Barnes suggests that it "belongs to the "class" of psalms which refer to the trials of the righteous".

Verses 9, 17 and 18 suggest that the psalmist is an old man, perhaps a king towards the end of his reign, seeking relief from distress in form of severe illness or the approach of death (verse 20), as well as the taunts of his "enemies" asserting that God has abandoned him (verse 11). The writer affirms his close relationship with God as he speaks of the faith in God which has sustained him all his life (verses 5–6, cf. 17), praying that God will not reject him (verse 9), declaring his witness to God's salvation (verses 15, 18), while asking for renewed health (verses 20–21) and the discrediting of his
enemies (verse 13, cf. verse 4), then he will renew his praises (verses 14–16, 22–24).

Ignatius M.C. Obinwa is the only person to have written a book on this psalm, based on his doctoral thesis. Obinwa uses a quantitative lexical analysis to argue that the theme of the psalm is not old age, but refuge and YHWH's righteousness.

One unique feature of this psalm is the frequent allusion to other psalms (even almost direct quotation) such as:
 Verses 1–3 almost matches Psalm 31:1–3
 Verses 5–6 alludes to Psalm 22:9–10
 Verse 11 (NRSV reverses the clauses) to Psalm 22:1
 Verses 12–13 to Psalm 35:22; 38:21; 40:13–14
 Verse 24 to Psalm 35:4, 26; 40:14.

Uses

Judaism 
 Verse 19 is part of Tzidkatcha.

Book of Common Prayer 
In the Church of England's Book of Common Prayer, this psalm is appointed to be read on the morning of the 14th day of the month.

Musical settings 
Heinrich Schütz set Psalm 71 in a metred version in German, "Auf dich, Herr, trau ich alle Zeit", SWV 168, as part of the Becker Psalter, first published in 1628.

Marc-Antoine Charpentier, "In te Domine speravi" H.228, for soloists, chorus, strings and continuo (1699)

References

External links 

 
 
  in Hebrew and English, Mechon-mamre
 Text of Psalm 71 according to the 1928 Psalter
 Psalm 71 – Older in Years, Strong in Faith text and detailed commentary, enduringword.com
 In you, LORD, I take refuge; let me never be put to shame. text and footnotes, United States Conference of Catholic Bishops
 Psalm 71:1 introduction and text, Bible study tools.
 Psalm 71 / Refrain: O God, be not far from me. Church of England
 Psalm 71 at Bible gateway.
 Calvin's Commentaries, Vol. 10: Psalms, Part III, tr. by John King (1847–50): Psalm 71. Sacred texts.
 Charles H. Spurgeon: Psalm 71 detailed commentary, spurgeon.org.

071